Struga Banska is a village on the river Una in central Croatia. It is connected by the D47 highway. The nearest larger towns are Dvor (Croatia) and Novi Grad (across the river in Bosnia).

References

Populated places in Sisak-Moslavina County